High-precision experiments could reveal
small previously unseen differences between the behavior
of matter and antimatter.
This prospect is appealing to physicists because it may
show that nature is not Lorentz symmetric.

Introduction 
Ordinary matter is made up of protons, electrons, and neutrons.
The quantum behavior of these particles can be predicted with excellent accuracy
using the Dirac equation, named after P.A.M. Dirac.
One of the triumphs of the Dirac equation is
its prediction of the existence of antimatter particles.
Antiprotons, positrons, and antineutrons
are now well understood,
and can be created and studied in experiments.

High-precision experiments have been unable to
detect any difference between the masses
of particles and
those of the corresponding antiparticles.
They also have been unable to detect any difference between the magnitudes of
the charges,
or between the lifetimes,
of particles and antiparticles.
These mass, charge, and lifetime symmetries
are required in a Lorentz and CPT symmetric universe,
but are only a small number of the properties that need to match
if the universe is Lorentz and CPT symmetric.

The Standard-Model Extension (SME),
a comprehensive theoretical framework for Lorentz and CPT violation,
makes specific predictions
about how particles and antiparticles
would behave differently in a universe
that is very close to,
but not exactly,
Lorentz symmetric.
In loose terms,
the SME can be visualized
as being constructed from
fixed background fields
that interact weakly, but differently,
with particles and antiparticles.

The behavioral differences between
matter and antimatter
are specific to each individual experiment.
Factors that determine the behavior include
the particle species involved,
the electromagnetic, gravitational, and nuclear fields controlling the system.
Furthermore,
for any Earth-bound experiment,
the rotational and orbital motion of the Earth is important,
leading to sidereal and seasonal signals.
For experiments conducted in space, the orbital motion of the craft
is an important factor in determining the signals
of Lorentz violation that might arise.
To harness the predictive power of the SME in any specific system,
a calculation has to be performed
so that all these factors can be accounted for.
These calculations are facilitated by the reasonable assumption that Lorentz
violations, if they exist,
are small. This makes it possible to use perturbation theory to obtain results
that would otherwise be extremely difficult to find.

The SME generates a modified Dirac equation
that breaks Lorentz symmetry
for some types of particle motions, but not others.
It therefore holds important information
about how Lorentz violations might have been hidden
in past experiments,
or might be revealed in future ones.

Lorentz violation tests with Penning Traps 
A Penning trap
is a research apparatus
capable of trapping individual charged particles
and their antimatter counterparts.
The trapping mechanism is
a strong magnetic field that keeps the particles near a central axis,
and an electric field that turns the particles around
when they stray too far along the axis.
The motional frequencies of the trapped particle
can be monitored and measured with astonishing precision.
One of these frequencies is the anomaly frequency,
which has played an important role in the measurement
of the gyromagnetic ratio of the electron (see ).

The first calculations of SME effects
in Penning traps
were published in 1997
and 1998.
They showed that,
in identical Penning traps,
if the
anomaly frequency of an electron was increased,
then the anomaly frequency of a positron
would be decreased.
The size of the increase or decrease
in the frequency
would be a measure of
the strength of one of the SME background fields.
More specifically,
it is a measure
of the component of the background field
along the direction of the axial magnetic field.

In tests of Lorentz symmetry,
the noninertial nature of the laboratory
due to the rotational and orbital motion of the Earth
has to be taken into account.
Each Penning-trap measurement
is the projection of the background SME fields
along the axis of the experimental magnetic field
at the time of the experiment.
This is further complicated if the experiment takes
hours, days, or longer to perform.

One approach is to seek instantaneous differences,
by comparing anomaly frequencies
for a particle and an antiparticle
measured at the same time on different days.
Another approach is to seek
sidereal variations,
by continuously monitoring
the anomaly frequency for just one species of particle
over an extended time.
Each offers different challenges.
For example,
instantaneous comparisons
require the electric field in the trap to be
precisely reversed,
while sidereal tests are limited
by the stability of the magnetic field.

An experiment conducted by the physicist Gerald Gabrielse of Harvard University involved two particles confined in a Penning trap. The idea was to compare a proton and an antiproton, but to overcome the technicalities of having opposite charges,
a negatively charged hydrogen ion was used in place of the proton. The ion, two electrons bound electrostatically with a proton, and the antiproton have the same charge and can therefore be simultaneously trapped. This design allows for quick interchange of the proton and the antiproton and so an instantaneous-type Lorentz test can be performed. The cyclotron frequencies of the two trapped particles
were about 90 MHz, and the apparatus was capable of resolving differences
in these of about 1.0 Hz. The absence of Lorentz violating effects of this type
placed a limit on combinations of -type SME coefficients that had not been accessed in other experiments. The results
appeared in Physical Review Letters in 1999.

The Penning-trap group at the University of Washington, headed by the Nobel Laureate Hans Dehmelt, conducted a search for sidereal variations in the anomaly frequency of a trapped electron. The results were extracted from an experiment that ran for several weeks, and the analysis required splitting the data into "bins" according to the orientation of the apparatus in the inertial reference frame of the Sun. At a resolution of 0.20 Hz, they were unable to discern any sidereal variations in the anomaly frequency, which runs around 185,000,000 Hz. Translating this into an upper bound on the relevant
SME background field, places a bound of about
10−24 GeV on a -type electron coefficient.
This work
was published in Physical Review Letters in 1999.

Another experimental result from the Dehmelt group involved a comparison of the instantaneous type. Using data from a single trapped electron
and a single trapped positron, they again found no difference
between the two anomaly frequencies at a resolution of about 0.2 Hz.
This result placed a bound on a simpler combination of
-type coefficients at a level of about 10−24 GeV.
In addition to being a limit on Lorentz violation,
this also limits the CPT violation.
This result
appeared in Physical Review Letters in 1999.

Lorentz violation in antihydrogen 
The antihydrogen atom is
the antimatter counterpart of the hydrogen atom.
It has a negatively charged antiproton
at the nucleus
that attracts a positively charged positron
orbiting around it.

The spectral lines of hydrogen have frequencies
determined by the energy differences
between the quantum-mechanical orbital states
of the electron.
These lines
have been studied in thousands of spectroscopic experiments
and are understood in great detail.
The quantum mechanics of the positron orbiting an antiproton
in the antihydrogen atom is expected to be very similar
to that of the hydrogen atom.
In fact,
conventional physics predicts that the spectrum of antihydrogen
is identical to that of regular hydrogen.

In the presence of the background fields of the SME,
the spectra of hydrogen and antihydrogen
are expected to show tiny differences
in some lines,
and no differences in others.
Calculations of these SME effects
in antihydrogen and hydrogen
were published
in Physical Review Letters
in 1999.
One of the main results found
is that hyperfine transitions
are sensitive to Lorentz breaking effects.

Several experimental groups at CERN are working on producing antihydrogen: AEGIS, ALPHA, ASACUSA, ATRAP, and GBAR.

Creating trapped antihydrogen
in sufficient quantities
to do spectroscopy
is an enormous experimental challenge.
Signatures of Lorentz violation
are similar to those expected in Penning traps.
There would be sidereal effects
causing variations in the spectral frequencies
as the experimental laboratory turns with the Earth.
There would also be the possibility of finding instantaneous
Lorentz breaking signals
when antihydrogen spectra are compared directly with conventional hydrogen spectra

In October 2017, the BASE experiment at CERN reported a measurement of the antiproton magnetic moment to a precision of 1.5 parts per billion. It is consistent with the most precise measurement of the proton magnetic moment (also made by BASE in 2014), which supports the hypothesis of CPT symmetry. This measurement represents the first time that a property of antimatter is known more precisely than the equivalent property in matter.

Lorentz violation with muons 
The muon and its positively charged antiparticle
have been used to perform tests of Lorentz symmetry.
Since the lifetime of the muon is only a few microseconds,
the experiments are quite different
from ones with electrons and positrons.
Calculations for muon experiments
aimed at probing Lorentz violation
in the SME
were first published in the year 2000.

In the year 2001,
Hughes and collaborators published their results
from a search for sidereal signals in the spectrum
of muonium,
an atom consisting of an electron bound to a negatively charged muon.
Their data,
taken over a two-year period,
showed no evidence for Lorentz violation.
This placed a stringent constraint on
a combination of -type coefficients in the SME,
published in Physical Review Letters.

In 2008,
the Muon  Collaboration at the Brookhaven National Laboratory published results after searching for signals of Lorentz violation with muons and antimuons.
In one type of analysis, they compared the anomaly frequencies
for the muon and its antiparticle. In another, they looked for sidereal variations by allocating their data into one-hour "bins" according to the orientation of the Earth relative to the Sun-centered inertial reference frame.
Their results, published in Physical Review Letters in 2008,
show no signatures of Lorentz violation at the resolution of the Brookhaven experiment.

Experimental results in all sectors of the
SME are summarized in the Data Tables for Lorentz and CPT violation.

See also 

 AEGIS Experiment 
 ALPHA Experiment
 ASACUSA Experiment 
 ATRAP Experiment
 Lorentz-violating electrodynamics
 Lorentz-violating neutrino oscillations
 Standard-Model Extension
 Tests of special relativity
 Test theories of special relativity

References

External links 
 Background information on Lorentz and CPT violation
 Data Tables for Lorentz and CPT Violation
 AEGIS Experiment
 ALPHA Experiment
 ASACUSA Experiment
 ATRAP Experiment
 Muon  Experiment

Antimatter